Santo Tomé Department is a  department of Corrientes Province in Argentina.

Settlements 
 Garruchos
 Gobernador Virasoro
 José Rafael Gómez
 Santo Tomé

Departments of Corrientes Province